Pictures from Life's Other Side" is a traditional song popularized by Hank Williams under the pseudonym "Luke the Drifter."   It was released on MGM Records in 1951.

Background
The exact origins of "Pictures from Life's Other Side" are disputed.  Some researchers date the song back to around 1880 and cite a singing-school teacher from Athens, Georgia named John B. Vaughan as its composer, while others credit Charles E. Baer. Regardless, the song was well known; early country singers Vernon Dalhart and Bradley Kincaid had already recorded it and Woody Guthrie cut a version of it in 1944. The song, an appeal for compassion and understanding for the downtrodden, recounts three "scenes," the second of which is sometimes excluded:  the first that of a degenerate gambler who dies right after staking his dead mother's wedding ring during a card game, his "last earthy treasure,"; the second that of "two brothers, whose pathway so diff'rent had led": one becomes wealthy, while the other one "begged for his bread" and unwittingly kills his brother (the rich man) in a robbery; and the last that of a "heartbroken mother" who drowns herself and her baby by jumping into a river.  The song is primarily associated with country singer Hank Williams, who recorded it under the name Luke the Drifter, an alter ego created by Williams and producer Fred Rose to let jukebox operators know that these heavily moralistic recitations that Williams wanted to release were not typical Hank Williams honky tonk singles; the pseudonym made it clear that the operators should not stock up on the releases like they usually did. Williams's version was recorded in Nashville on June 1, 1952.  He was backed by Jerry Rivers (fiddle), Don Helms (steel guitar), Sammy Pruett (electric guitar), Jack Shook (rhythm guitar), Ernire Newton or "Cedric Rainwater," aka Howard Watts (bass), and possibly Owen Bradley (organ). The song was the lead track on the 1954 LP Hank Williams as Luke the Drifter.

Cover versions

Johnny Dowd recorded the song on his album Koch Records.
Cowboy Copas recorded a version for Starday Records.
Bill Anderson recorded the song for Decca.
Red Sovine recorded it for Deluxe Records.
Porter Wagoner recorded the song.
Jerry Lee Lewis recorded two vastly different versions for Mercury.
George Jones recorded a rendition of the song for Epic Records.
Kris Kristofferson performs the song in the documentary In the Hank Williams Tradition.
Hank III performed the song with Marty Stuart on The Marty Stuart Show.
Ramblin' Jack Elliott recorded the song on his album The Long Ride.
Woody Guthrie recorded the song on the album The Asch Recordings.
Earl Scruggs recorded the song on the album I Saw The Light With Some Help From My Friends

References

1951 singles
Hank Williams songs
Song recordings produced by Fred Rose (songwriter)
MGM Records singles
Year of song unknown